Season five of Seinfeld, an American comedy television series created by Jerry Seinfeld and Larry David, began airing on September 16, 1993, and concluded on May 19, 1994, on NBC.

Production
Seinfeld was produced by Castle Rock Entertainment and distributed by Columbia Pictures Television and Columbia TriStar Television and was aired of NBC in the US. The executive producers were Larry David, George Shapiro, and Howard West with Tom Gammill and Max Pross as supervising producers. Bruce Kirschbaum was the executive consultant. This season was directed by Tom Cherones.

The series was set predominantly in an apartment block on New York City's Upper West Side; however, the fifth season was shot and mostly filmed in CBS Studio Center in Studio City, California. The show features Jerry Seinfeld as himself, and a host of Jerry's friends and acquaintances, which include George Costanza, Elaine Benes, and Kramer, portrayed by Jason Alexander, Julia Louis-Dreyfus and Michael Richards, respectively.

Reception

Critical reception 
The review aggregator website Rotten Tomatoes reported a 100% approval rating with an average rating of 10/10, based on 8 critic reviews.

Awards
Season five received 12 Emmy nominations and won two. Michael Richards won his second of three Emmys for Outstanding Supporting Actor in a Comedy Series. Janet Ashikaga won the Emmy for Outstanding Individual Achievement in Editing for a Series for the episode "The Opposite". Jerry Seinfeld was nominated for Outstanding Lead Actor in a Comedy Series. Jason Alexander was nominated for Outstanding Supporting Actor in a Comedy Series, losing to co-star Michael Richards. Julia Louis-Dreyfus was nominated for Outstanding Supporting Actress in a Comedy Series. Marlee Matlin was nominated for Outstanding Guest Actress in a Comedy Series for playing Laura in the episode "The Lip Reader". Judge Reinhold was nominated for Outstanding Guest Actor in a Comedy Series for playing Aaron for the episodes "The Raincoats (part 1 and 2)". The episode "The Mango" was nominated for two Emmys: Outstanding Writing in a Comedy Series (Lawrence H. Levy and Larry David), and Outstanding Directing in a Comedy Series (Tom Cherones). Larry David was also nominated for Outstanding Writing in a Comedy Series for the episode "The Puffy Shirt". Seinfeld was also nominated for Outstanding Sound Mixing in a Comedy Series or Special for the episode "The Bris". It was also nominated for Outstanding Comedy Series again, but lost to Frasier. Seinfeld was also nominated for four Golden Globe Awards and won three of them: Best Performance by an Actor in TV series-comedy (Jerry Seinfeld), Best Performance by an Actress in a Supporting Role in a Series, Mini-Series or Motion Picture Made for TV (Julia Louis- Dreyfus), and Best TV series-comedy/musical. Jason Alexander was nominated for Best Performance by an Actor in a Supporting Role in a Series, Mini-Series or Motion Picture Made for TV. This season was also nominated for Directors Guild of America (Tom Cherones) for "The Mango", and won a Writers Guild of America Award (Lawrence H. Levy and Larry David) for "The Mango".

Nielsen ratings
Season five placed #3 in the Nielsen ratings below Home Improvement and 60 Minutes.

Episodes

References

External links

 
 
 

5
1993 American television seasons
1994 American television seasons